Ayalew is a personal name, following the Habesha name system, of Ethiopian and Eritrean origin. Notable people with the name include:

Ayalew Birru (1892–1945), Ethiopian military officer
Aweke Ayalew (born 1993), Bahraini middle-distance and long-distance runner
Hiwot Ayalew (born 1990), Ethiopian long-distance runner
Lidetu Ayalew (born 1969), Ethiopian politician
Wude Ayalew (born 1987), Ethiopian long-distance runner

Ethiopian given names